Șibot (or Zsibotalkenyér) is a commune located in Alba County, Transylvania, Romania. It is composed of four villages: Băcăinți (Bocksdorf, Bokajalfalu), Balomiru de Câmp (Ballendorf, Balomir), Sărăcsău (Szarakszó), and Șibot.

The commune is located in the western part of the county, on the border with Hunedoara County.

Natives
Iosif Sîrbu (1925–1964), sport shooter and Romania’s first ever Olympic champion.

References

Communes in Alba County
Localities in Transylvania